Madras is a 2014 Indian Tamil-language drama film written and directed by Pa. Ranjith. It was produced by K. E. Gnanavel Raja under his production company, Studio Green. The film features Karthi and Catherine Tresa in the lead roles, with Kalaiyarasan, Riythvika and Rama playing supporting roles. The film's story revolves around Kaali (Karthi), an impulsive and short-tempered IT professional who lives in the Vyasarpadi area of Chennai. His friend Anbu (Kalaiyarasan) is killed in the midst of a feud between two factions of a political party over a building wall at one of the housing board apartments in the area. When Kaali hears of this, he decides to avenge Anbu's death. The soundtrack and score were composed by Santhosh Narayanan while the cinematography and editing were handled by Murali G and Praveen K. L. respectively.

Released on 26 September 2014, the film garnered generally positive reviews and was a commercial success at the box office. It was included in The Hindu's top 20 Tamil-language films of the year. The film won 24 awards from 51 nominations; its direction, screenplay, performances of the cast members, music, and cinematography have received the most attention from award groups.

At the 62nd Filmfare Awards South, Madras was nominated in eleven categories, winning Critics Award for Best Actor (Karthi), Best Female Debut (Tresa), Best Supporting Actress (Riythvika) and Best Male Playback Singer (Pradeep Kumar for "Aagayam Theepidicha"). At the 9th Vijay Awards, it received fifteen nominations and won three, Best Supporting Actor, Best Male Playback Singer and a Special Jury Award. Madras received thirteen nominations at the 4th South Indian International Movie Awards ceremony and won six awards, including those for Best Director and Best Male Playback Singer. Karthi and Tresa won the Best Actor Critics and Best Debut Actress awards respectively. Among other wins, the film received seven Ananda Vikatan Cinema Awards and four Edison Awards. It also received a nomination for Best Playback Singer (Female) for Shakthisree Gopalan at the Norway Tamil Film Festival Awards.

Awards and nominations

See also 
 List of Tamil films of 2014

Notes

References

External links 
 Accolades for Madras (film) at the Internet Movie Database

Madras (film)